The Thomas Homestead is a historic homestead off Arkansas Highway 7 in Fairview, Arkansas.  The property includes a dogtrot house built c. 1910, a potato house, and outbuildings including barns and sheds.

The property was listed on the National Register of Historic Places in 1984.

See also
National Register of Historic Places listings in Dallas County, Arkansas

References

Gallery

Houses on the National Register of Historic Places in Arkansas
Houses completed in 1910
Houses in Dallas County, Arkansas
National Register of Historic Places in Dallas County, Arkansas